Ice Maiden may refer to:
Mummy Juanita, an Inca mummy
Siberian Ice Maiden, a Pazyryk body found mummified in Siberia
Icemaiden, a DC comic book superheroine
The Ice-Maiden, an 1861 story by Hans Christian Andersen
The Ice Maiden, a 2002 novel by Edna Buchanan
Ice Maiden, a 2011 novel by Sally Prue
Ice Maiden Expedition, a 2017–2018 British Army expedition to Antarctica